Schweina is a village and a former municipality in the Wartburgkreis district of Thuringia, Germany. Since 31 December 2012, it is part of the town Bad Liebenstein.

Former municipalities in Thuringia
Duchy of Saxe-Meiningen